Theekattu is a 1987 Indian Malayalam film, directed by Joseph Vattoli. The film stars Jagathy Sreekumar, Ratheesh, Rohini and Captain Raju in the lead roles. The film has musical score by Murali Sithara.

Cast
Jagathy Sreekumar as Kachan Kurichi
Ratheesh as Jayadevan
Jayalalita as Sreedevi
Rohini as Mercy
Captain Raju as Basheer
T. G. Ravi as Ramadas
Preetha A as Ramadas's daughter 
Santhakumari as Jayadevan's  mother
Jagannatha Varma as Radha's father
Kundara Johnny as James
Bobby Kottarakkara as Susheela
Saudamini as Chandrika
Vettoor Purushan as Ramanan

Soundtrack
The music was composed by Murali Sithara and the lyrics were written by Kollam Vidyadharan.

References

External links
 

1987 films
1980s Malayalam-language films